Ji-ha, also spelled Jee-ha or Chi-ha, is a Korean unisex given name. Its meaning differs based on the hanja used to write each syllable of the name. There are 46 hanja with the reading "ji" and 24 hanja with the reading "ha" on the South Korean government's official list of hanja which may be registered for use in given names.

People with this name include:
Kim Chi-ha (born 1941), South Korean male poet
Lee Ji-ha (born 1970), South Korean actress
Jiha Moon (born 1973), South Korean-born American female visual artist
Jiha Lee, 21st century American female keyboardist of Korean descent

Fictional characters with this name include:
Shin Jee-ha, in 2005 South Korean manhwa series Veritas

See also
List of Korean given names

References

Korean unisex given names